Macrobathra peraeota is a moth in the family Cosmopterigidae. It was described by Edward Meyrick in 1921. It is found in Mozambique.

References

Endemic fauna of Mozambique
Macrobathra
Moths described in 1921
Moths of Sub-Saharan Africa
Lepidoptera of Mozambique